Ordo Regnum Sathanas is the second compilation by the black metal band Horna. It was released on Adversary Productions in 2004 and was limited to 300 copies.

Track listing
Korpin Hetki - 3:36
Ihmisviha - 3:10
Kun Synkkä Ikuisuus Avautuu - 3:26
Black Metal Sodomy - 2:15
Ordo Regnum Sathanas 16:15
Ring to Rule - 3:01
Haudanusva - 3:56
Pimeys Yllä Pyhän Maan - 4:11
Verikammari - 6:30
Ghash Inras - 5:15
Perimä Vihassa Ja Verikostossa - 7:56

Personnel

Additional personnel
 Christophe Szpajdel - logo

External links
Metal Archives
Official Horna Site

Horna albums
2004 compilation albums